Robert 'Bob' Leslie Short (born 12 September 1948) is an English former first-class cricketer.

Short was born at Chesterfield in September 1948. He was educated at Denstone College, before going up to Emmanuel College, Cambridge. While studying at Cambridge, he played first-class cricket for Cambridge University Cricket Club in 1969 and 1970, making eleven appearances against. Playing as a batsman in the Cambridge side, Short scored 355 runs at an average of 18.68; he recorded one half century, a score of 58, which was his only score above fifty. His brother,  David, played first-class cricket at county level.

References

External links

1948 births
Living people
Cricketers from Chesterfield, Derbyshire
People educated at Denstone College
Alumni of Emmanuel College, Cambridge
Cambridge University cricketers